Potton United F.C. is an English football club based in Potton, Bedfordshire.

History
The club was established in 1943 and won the Bedfordshire Intermediate Cup in 1944. After World War II they joined the South Midlands League. In 1955, the club applied to join the Parthenon League, but were rejected. After a season without league fixtures, they joined Division One South of the Central Alliance. In 1961 they joined the United Counties League (UCL).

They won the Premier Division of the UCL in 1986–87 and again in 1988–89. They were relegated to Division One at the end of the 2000–01 season, but were promoted back to the Premier Division after winning Division One in 2003–04. They finished as runners-up in both of their first two seasons back in the Premier Division. However, they were relegated back to Division One at the end of the 2008–09 season. After an eight year absence, they were promoted back to the Premier Division after finishing in second position in the 2017–18 United Counties League Division One.

Honours
United Counties League
Premier Division champions 1986–87, 1988–89
Division One champions 2003–04
Division One runners-up 2017–18
Knockout Cup winners 1972–73, 2004–05
Bedfordshire Intermediate Cup
Winners 1944
 North Beds Charity Cup
 Winners 2017-18

Records
FA Cup
Third Qualifying Round 1974–75
FA Trophy
Third Qualifying Round 1971–72, 1972–73
FA Vase
Fifth Round 1989–90

References

External links
Potton United Website 

Association football clubs established in 1943
South Midlands League
Spartan South Midlands Football League
United Counties League
Football clubs in Bedfordshire
1943 establishments in England
Football clubs in England
Potton